Charles Edward Merriam Jr. (1874–1953) was an American professor of political science at the University of Chicago, founder of the behavioral approach to political science, a trainer of many graduate students, a prominent intellectual in the Progressive Movement, and an advisor to several US Presidents.  Upon his death, The New York Times called him "one of the outstanding political scientists in the country".

Early life and education
Charles Merriam was born in Hopkinton, Iowa, on November 15, 1874, to Charles Edward Merriam and Margaret Campbell Kirkwood Merriam. The Merriams traced their lineage to Scottish immigrants who settled in Massachusetts in 1638. The father moved to Iowa in 1855, and served with the 12th Iowa Infantry Regiment in the American Civil War. Charles and Margaret (both Presbyterians) were married in 1868. Charles E. Merriam Sr. owned a dry goods store and was postmaster and president of the school board in Hopkinton. Charles Jr.'s elder brother was John C. Merriam (who became a noted paleontologist), and he had a younger sister, Susan Agnes Merriam.

Merriam attended public school in Hopkinton. He graduated from Lenox College in 1893 (his father was a trustee of the school), taught school for a year, and then returned to college to receive his Bachelor of Laws degree from the University of Iowa in 1895. He received his master's degree in 1897 and Doctor of Philosophy degree in 1900 from Columbia University. He studied in Paris and Berlin in 1899 while completing his PhD. Among his mentors from whom he adopted much of his early political thought were Frank Johnson Goodnow, Otto von Gierke, and James Harvey Robinson.

He married Elizabeth Hilda Doyle (of Constable, New York) in 1900.

Career

Academic career and contributions
Merriam joined the faculty at the University of Chicago in 1900 as the first member of the political science faculty. He authored A History of American Political Theories in 1903, a notable analysis of American political movements which strongly supported the emerging Progressive movement. He moved up quickly in the department, reached the rank of full Professor in 1911, and served as chairman of the department of political science from 1911 until his retirement.  From 1907 to 1911, he served as chairman of the College of Commerce and Administration (the precursor to the Booth School of Business).

Merriam significantly influenced the discipline of political science in the United States during his years in academia. As two political scientists noted in their study of the discipline in 1985, "Merriam's hand can be seen in virtually every facet of modern political science." "As much as any single scholar during this period, Merriam set the standard for how American democracy should be studied within the academy" was the assessment of Merriam's thinking on the discipline by another political scientist in 2008. The political scientist Gabriel Almond concluded, "The Chicago school is generally acknowledged to have been the founding influence in the history of modern political science, and Charles E. Merriam is generally recognized as the founder and shaper of the Chicago school."

Merriam was a leading advocate of the use of data and quantitative analysis in the practice of political science (even though he himself had almost no training in mathematics or statistics), and he founded the behavioralistic approach to political science. Merriam "denied the utility of theory" and advocated instead a "practical" political science aimed at creating a more harmonious, democratic, and pluralistic society. A corollary to this thinking was his "vision of social scientists as technical advisors to society's political leaders."

Merriam also deeply influenced the administration of political science in academia. He assembled a faculty that represented some of the best scholars of the day, and he and the faculty produced some of the brightest political scientists of the next generation, creating a department that dominated the discipline for 30 years. His influence was such that the department's structure, personnel, and reputation largely did not survive his retirement in 1940. He also pushed the discipline to move away from European-style theoretical discussion and into actual research, and he established the first social science interdisciplinary research institutes in the United States. He was also a leader in pursuing private grants and foundation money as a means of funding this research. According to Harold Lasswell, Merriam also promoted use of concepts from psychology to the field of political science.

Merriam was a critic of the states system in the United States. He argued that the states system was a problem for cities, as the state governments neither governed the cities nor allowed the cities to govern themselves.

Local political career
Merriam was a member of the Chicago City Charter Convention of 1906. He was commissioned by the City Club of Chicago in 1906 to study Chicago's tax system, and later served as a vice president of that influential organization. He served as a Chicago City Council Alderman for the old 7th Ward from 1909 to 1911, winning office (in part) due to the success of his 1903 textbook. He served on two key committees (Crime and Finance), and also served on three important city commissions (City Expenditures, Harbor, and Waste). While serving on the Harbor Commission, he became acquainted with Frederic Delano, uncle of Franklin D. Roosevelt.

He left office in 1911 to run (unsuccessfully) as a Republican for Mayor of Chicago. His campaign manager was Harold Ickes. Although he won the Republican primary by a very wide margin, he narrowly lost the general election to Carter Harrison Jr. Merriam and Ickes helped co-found the Illinois Progressive Party, and they supported Robert M. La Follette for president until Theodore Roosevelt defeated him for the Progressive Party nomination. He campaigned for former President Theodore Roosevelt under the "Bull Moose" ticket in 1912. He again served as an Alderman from 1913 to 1917, albeit as an Independent rather than a Republican. In 1916, he established the Bureau of Public Efficiency, a private organization which helped establish many quasi-public corporations and organized the Chicago Park District. Merriam lost his bid for re-election as alderman after being defeated in the Republican primary by just five votes in 1917. He unsuccessfully ran again for mayor in 1919, losing the Republican primary to incumbent William Hale Thompson.

Federal service

Charles E. Merriam was an advisor to several presidents, and had a lengthy career in federal service.  In 1911, President William Howard Taft offered him a seat on the Commission on Economy and Efficiency, a body established under the authority of the Civil Appropriations Act of 1910 to study the administration of the executive branch, but Merriam declined. In 1917, President Woodrow Wilson asked him to serve on the newly formed Tariff Commission (now the United States International Trade Commission), but again he declined federal service.

During World War I, the 43-year-old Merriam joined the US Army Signal Corps, was commissioned a captain, and served on the federal government's Aviation Examining Board for the Chicago region. He was also on the federal government's Committee on Public Information, an independent government agency created to influence US public opinion and encourage American participation in World War I. From April to September 1918, he was American High Commissioner for Public Information in Rome, Italy, where he developed propaganda designed to sway Italian public opinion. His mission was not only to encourage the Italian public to keep Italy in the war on the Allied side but also to undermine support for socialist and communist political parties. He may even have used Rockefeller Foundation money to help convince socialist leader Benito Mussolini to support the war. During his time in Rome, however, Merriam usurped the prerogatives of the US ambassador and embassy staff, and his repeated clashes caused him to be sent back to the United States after just six months in the post. Merriam claimed to be deeply shaken by his experiences in Italy, although he did not make clear in what way his views had changed. He also engaged in an extramarital affair while overseas, which led to marital problems.

Back in Chicago, Merriam coordinated and edited a series of comparative studies by political scientists on the use of expertise in policy making, civic education, and public opinion. Merriam's contribution to the series, The Making of Citizens (1934), was highly laudatory of Soviet Russia, Nazi Germany, and Fascist Italy's use of these tools to strengthen the sense of national purpose and achieve policy goals. Merriam was highly critical of these regimes, though, and felt that a more scientific approach would avoid the messianism on which these governments relied and strengthen democratic and pluralistic norms.

He co-founded the Local Community Research Committee (LCRC) in 1923 with money from the Laura Spelman Rockefeller Memorial Foundation, he set up programs to collecting data on urban problems, and disseminating current policy ideas. He also helped organize the Social Science Research Council (an outgrowth of the LCRC) in 1923 with a grant from the Rockefeller Foundation, and served as its first president in 1924. In 1929, he co-founded (again, with a grant from the Spelman Rockefeller Memorial Foundation) the Public Administration Clearing House, an umbrella group which fostered collaboration and communication among associations in the field of public administration.

Merriam served as president of the American Political Science Association in 1925. That same year, he authored the book New Aspects of Politics, which called for marshalling the resources of political science research in a search for solutions to pressing social issues.

Merriam returned to government service in 1929, serving as vice chairman on President Herbert Hoover's President's Research Committee on Social Trends (PRCST). A landmark federal research initiative into demographics and emerging social issues, the PRCST "altered the direction and use of social science research in the United States."

His relationship with Ickes allowed him to continue his service in the nation's capital under President Franklin D. Roosevelt. During the Great Depression, he was considered the country's most influential political scientist. In July 1933, Harold Ickes (now United States Secretary of the Interior) appointed Merriam to serve on the National Planning Board (and its successors, the National Resources Board and the National Resources Planning Board) Merriam was the body's most influential member. In this capacity, he helped draft proposals for an expansive welfare state. Although President Roosevelt approved of the plans and proposed implementing them in his "Four Freedoms" speech of January 6, 1941, the proposals were politically not viable and were never adopted.

In 1934, Merriam served on the Commission of Inquiry on Public Service Personnel, a research group established by the Social Science Research Council to research, analyze, and make proposals regarding the federal civil service and civil service reform (with an eye to the innovations made by the Tennessee Valley Authority). The body was funded by the Spelman Rockefeller Memorial Foundation, and Luther Gulick was the Commission's research director. The group made a number of important proposals regarding civil service reform, although not all were adopted. It did spark interest in the merit system, and many of its civil service reform proposals were adopted by several states.

Merriam believed that part of the success or failure of the National Planning Board's proposals depended on the administrative capacity of the executive branch to adopt and push for the recommended policies. Therefore, Merriam began lobbying President Roosevelt for a commission to study the structure and functions of the executive. Roosevelt was very receptive to the idea.  The Supreme Court had struck down the National Industrial Recovery Act (a key legislative accomplishment of the New Deal) in Schechter Poultry Corp. v. United States, 295 U.S. 495 (1935), and significantly limited the president's power to remove members of independent executive agencies in Panama Refining Co. v. Ryan, 293 U.S. 388 (1935). Merriam assured the president that if he established a committee to review the administration of the executive branch, the committee's report could be written in such a way as to justify the president's reorganization goals while couching them in the neutral language of academic research. On March 22, 1936, Roosevelt established the Committee on Administrative Management (commonly known as the Brownlow Committee) and charged it with developing proposals for reorganizing the executive branch. Besides himself, the three-person committee consisted of Louis Brownlow, and Luther Gulick. On January 10, 1937, the committee released its report. Famously declaring "The President needs help," the committee's report advocated a strong chief executive, including among its 37 recommendations significant expansion of the presidential staff, integration of managerial agencies into a single presidential office, expansion of the merit system, integration of all independent agencies into existing Cabinet departments, and modernization of federal accounting and financial practices.

Retirement and death
Charles Merriam retired from the University of Chicago in 1940, at the age of 66.

He was the last director of the Lucy Spelman Rockefeller Memorial Fund, acting in that capacity from 1940 until its merger with the Rockefeller Foundation in 1949.

Charles Merriam died on January 8, 1953, at Hilltop Hospital in Rockville, Maryland, after a long illness. He was survived by his daughter and three sons. He is buried at Arlington National Cemetery.

The University of Illinois picks a distinguished academic to honor with the Charles E. Merriam Award for Outstanding Public Policy Research.

Notable works
Merriam was a prolific author during his lifetime. Some of his more notable works include:
 A History of American Political Theories. New York: MacMillan, 1903.
 The American Party System: An Introduction to the Study of Political Parties in the United States. New York: MacMillan, 1922.
 Non-Voting: Causes and Methods of Control. Chicago: The University of Chicago Press, 1924.
 New Aspects of Politics. Chicago: University of Chicago Press, 1925.
 The Making of Citizens: A Comparative Study of Methods of Civic Training. Chicago: University of Chicago Press, 1931.
 Civic Education in the United States. New York: Scribner, 1934.

Notes

References

Footnotes

Bibliography
 Adams, David K. Reflections on American Exceptionalism. Staffordshire, England: Ryburn, 1994.
 Adcock, Robert. Modern Political Science: Anglo-American Exchanges Since 1880. Princeton, N.J.: Princeton University Press, 2007.
 Almond, Gabriel A. Ventures in Political Science: Narratives and Reflections. Boulder, Colo.: Rienner, 2002.
 Axelrod, Alan. Selling the Great War: The Making of American Propaganda. New York: Palgrave Macmillan, 2009.
 Bachin, Robin Faith. Building the South Side: Urban Space and Civic Culture in Chicago, 1890–1919. Chicago: University of Chicago Press, 2004.
 Biddle, Jeff. "Social Science and the Making of Social Policy: Wesley Mitchell's Vision." In The Economic Mind in America: Essays in the History of American Economics. Malcolm Rutherford, ed. Florence, Ky.: Routledge, 1998.
 Bishop, Glenn A. and Gilbert, Paul T. Chicago's Accomplishments and Leaders. Chicago: Bishop Pub. Co., 1932.
 Bukowski, Douglas. Big Bill Thompson, Chicago, and the Politics of Image. Urbana, Ill.: University of Illinois Press, 1998.
 Calabresi, Steven G., and Yoo, Christopher S. The Unitary Executive: Presidential Power From Washington to Bush. New Haven, Conn.: Yale University Press, 2008.
 Catledge, Turner. "Capitol Startled." New York Times. January 13, 1937.
 Ciepley, David. Liberalism in the Shadow of Totalitarianism. Cambridge, Massachusetts: Harvard University Press, 2006.
 Costigliola, Frank. Awkward Dominion: American Political, Economic, and Cultural Relations With Europe, 1919–1933. Ithaca, N.Y.: Cornell University Press, 1984.
 Creel, George. How We Advertised America: The First Telling of the Amazing Story of the Committee on Public Information That Carried the Gospel of Americanism to Every Corner of the Globe. Whitefish, Mont.: Kessinger Publishing, 2008.
 Crick, Bernard. The American Science of Politics. Reprint ed. Florence, Ky.: Routledge, 2003.
 Crowther-Heyck, Hunter. Herbert A. Simon: The Bounds of Reason in Modern America. Baltimore: Johns Hopkins University Press, 2005.
 Davis, David Howard. Ignoring the Apocalypse: Why Planning to Prevent Environmental Catastrophe Goes Astray. Westport, Conn.: Praeger, 2007.
 Dickinson, Matthew J. Bitter Harvest: FDR, Presidential Power, and the Growth of the Presidential Branch. New York: Cambridge University Press, 1999.
 Domhoff, G. William. Who Really Rules?: New Haven and Community Power Reexamined. New Brunswick, N.J.: Transaction Books, 1978.
 "Dr. C.E. Merriam, Noted Educator." New York Times. January 9, 1953.
 Duck, Leigh Anne. The Nation's Region Southern Modernism, Segregation, and U.S. Nationalism. Athens, Ga.: University of Georgia Press, 2009.
 Featherman, David L. and Vinovskis, Maris. Social Science and Policy-Making: A Search for Relevance in the Twentieth Century. Ann Arbor, Mich.: University of Michigan Press, 2001.
 Felbinger, Claire L., and Haynes, Wendy A. Outstanding Women in Public Administration: Leaders, Mentors, and Pioneers. Armonk, N.Y.: M.E. Sharpe, 2004.
 Fesler, James W. Elements of Public Administration. Alcester, Warwickshire, U.K.: Brownell Press, 2007.
 Fosdick, Raymond Blaine. The Story of the Rockefeller Foundation. New Brunswick, N.J.: Transaction Publishers, 1989.
 "Foundation Lists $886,500 in Grants." New York Times. October 31, 1940.
 Galligan, Brian; Roberts, Winsome; and Trifiletti, Gabriella. Australians and Globalisation: The Experience of Two Centuries. Cambridge: Cambridge University Press, 2001.
 Gargan, John J. Handbook of State Government Administration. Florence, Ky.: CRC Press, 1999.
 Garson, George David. Group Theories of Politics. Beverly Hills, Calif.: Sage Publications, 1978.
 Gates, Richard. Early Urban Planning. Florence, Ky.: Routledge, 2004.
 Geiger, Roger L. To Advance Knowledge: The Growth of American Research Universities: 1900–1940. New Brunswick, N.J.: Transaction, 2004.
 Guttenberg, Albert Z. The Language of Planning: Essays on the Origins and Ends of American Planning Thought. Urbana, Ill.: University of Illinois Press, 1993.
 Hollinger, David A. Science, Jews, and Secular Culture: Studies in Mid-Twentieth-Century American Intellectual History. Princeton, N.J.: Princeton University Press, 1996.
 Karl, Barry Dean. Executive Reorganization and Reform in the New Deal: The Genesis of Administrative Management, 1900–1939. Cambridge, Massachusetts: Harvard University Press, 1963.
 Karl, Barry Dean.  Charles E. Merriam and the study of politics (1974) the standard scholarly biography
 Klausen, Jytte. War and Welfare: Europe and the United States, 1945 to the Present. New York: Palgrave Macmillan, 2001.
 Kloppenberg, James T. and Fox, Richard Wrightman. A Companion to American Thought. Oxford: Blackwell, 1995.
 Maisel, Louis Sandy. The Parties Respond: Changes in American Parties and Campaigns. Boulder, Colo.: Westview Press, 2002.
 Manning, Martin. Historical Dictionary of American Propaganda. Westport, Conn.: Greenwood Press, 2004.
 Mark, Stephen R. Preserving the Living Past: John C. Merriam's Legacy in the State and National Parks. Berkeley, Calif.: University of California Press, 2005.
 Merry, John F. History of Delaware County, Iowa, and Its People. Chicago: S.J. Clarke Pub. Co., 1914.
 Milkis, Sidney M. The New Deal and the Triumph of Liberalism. Amherst, Mass.: University of Massachusetts Press, 2002.
 Moe, Ronald C. Administrative Renewal: Reorganization Commissions in the 20th Century. Lanham, Md.: University Press of America, 2003.
 Niemei, Richard G. and Junn, Jane. Civic Education: What Makes Students Learn. New Haven, Conn.: Yale University Press, 2005.
 "$1,032,000 Grants By Spelman Fund." New York Times. April 17, 1947.
 Oren, Ido. Our Enemies and U.S.: America's Rivalries and the Making of Political Science. Ithaca, N.Y.: Cornell University Press, 2003.
 Pearson, Sidney A., Jr. "Introduction to the Transaction Edition." In Merriam, Charles E. A History of American Political Theories. New Brunswick, N.J.: Transaction Publishers, 2008.
 Pegram, Thomas R. Partisans and Progressives: Private Interest and Public Policy in Illinois, 1870–1922. Urbana, Ill.: University of Illinois Press, 1992.
 Pope, Charles Henry; Merriam, Charles Pierce; Gildersome-Dickinson, C.E.; and Merriam, James Sheldon. Merriam Genealogy in England and America: Including the "Genealogical Memoranda" of Charles Pierce Merriam, the Collections of James Sheldon Merriam, etc. Boston: Pope, 1906.
 Porter, Roy. The Cambridge History of Science. New York: Cambridge University Press, 2003.
 "The President's Commission on Economy and Efficiency." American Political Science Review. 5:4 (November 1911).
 "President Orders Own Survey to Cut New Deal Activity." New York Times. March 23, 1936.
 "Records of the National Resources Planning Board (NRPB), 1931–1943." Record Group 187. Guide to Federal Records in the National Archives of the United States. Compiled by Robert B. Matchette, et al. Washington, D.C.: National Archives and Records Administration, 1995.
 Reagan, Patrick D. Designing a New America: The Origins of New Deal Planning, 1890–1943. Amherst, Mass.: University of Massachusetts Press, 2000.
 Roelofs, Joan. Foundations and Public Policy: The Mask of Pluralism. Albany, N.Y.: State University of New York Press, 2003.
 Rossini, Daniela. Woodrow Wilson and the American Myth in Italy: Culture, Diplomacy, and War Propaganda. Cambridge, Massachusetts: Harvard University Press, 2008.
 Ruble, Blair A. Second Metropolis: Pragmatic Pluralism in Gilded Age Chicago, Silver Age Moscow, and Meiji Osaka. New York: Cambridge University Press, 2001.
 Rudalevige, Andrew. The New Imperial Presidency: Renewing Presidential Power After Watergate. Ann Arbor, Mich.: University of Michigan Press, 2005.
 Rudolph, Lloyd I., and Rudolph, Susanne Hoeber. Making U.S. Foreign Policy Toward South Asia: Regional Imperatives and the Imperial Presidency. New Delhi: Concept Pub. Co., 2008.
 Sawyers, June Skinner. Chicago Portraits: Biographies of 250 Famous Chicagoans. Chicago: Loyola University Press, 1991.
 Schnietz, Karen E. "The 1916 Tariff Commission: Democrats' Use of Expert Information to Constrain Republican Tariff Protection." Business and Economic History. 23:1 (Fall 1994).
 Seidelman, Raymond and Harpham, Edward J. Disenchanted Realists: Political Science and the American Crisis, 1884–1984. Albany, N.Y.: State University of New York Press, 1985.
 Shafritz, Jay M. "The Brownlow Committee." In The Dictionary of Public Policy and Administration. Jay M. Shafritz, ed. Boulder, Colo.: Westview Press, 2004.
 Smelser, Neil J. and Gerstein, Dean R. Behavioral and Social Science: Fifty Years of Discovery. Washington, D.C.: National Academy Press, 1986.
 Smith, Mark C. Social Science in the Crucible: The American Debate Over Objectivity and Purpose, 1918–1941. Durham, N.C.: Duke University Press, 1994.
 "Spelman Fund Aid of $657,800 Listed." New York Times. December 28, 1949.
 Sundquist, James L. The Decline and Resurgence of Congress. Washington, D.C.: Brookings Institution, 1981.
 Suny, Ronald Grigor. The Cambridge History of Russia. Vol. 3: The Twentieth Century. Cambridge: Cambridge University Press, 2006.
 United States Army. Iowa Infantry Regiment, 12th (1861–1865). Reunion of Twelfth Iowa Vet. Vol. Infantry. Dubuque, Ia.: The Regiment, 1903.
 U.S. President's Committee on Administrative Management. Report of the President's Committee. Washington, D.C.: Government Printing Office, 1937.
 Utter, Glenn H. and Lockhart, Charles. American Political Scientists: A Dictionary. Westport, Conn.: Greenwood Press, 2002.

External links

 
 "Charles E. Merriam – Political Science." The University of Chicago Faculty: A Centennial View. University of Chicago. – Biography and photographs
 "Charles Edward Merriam." Burial record at Arlington National Cemetery.
 
 Guide to the Charles E. Merriam Papers 1893–1957 at the University of Chicago Special Collections Research Center

1874 births
1953 deaths
American political scientists
People from Delaware County, Iowa
Chicago City Council members
Columbia University alumni
American people of Scottish descent
University of Chicago faculty
University of Iowa alumni
Illinois Progressives (1912)
American city managers
United States Army personnel of World War I
Franklin D. Roosevelt administration personnel
Illinois Republicans
Burials at Arlington National Cemetery
Social Science Research Council
Lenox College alumni